Patrick Jason Faber (born 21 March 1978) is a Belizean politician. He was the Leader of the Opposition. He formerly served as Minister of Education, Youth Sports and Culture. In July 2020 he was appointed the leader of the United Democratic Party, after Prime Minister Dean Barrow stated his plans to retire at the end of his term.

Early life and education
Faber was born in Belize City, Belize. He received a Bachelor of Arts in Economics in 1998 from Valdosta State University in Valdosta, Georgia, as well as a Master's in Educational Leadership from the University of North Florida in 2003. He is currently working on a Doctor of Public Administration degree from Valdosta State University.

Political career
Faber has been a member of the United Democratic Party of Belize since he worked as a street campaigner at the age of 14. He has since served as youth director, member of the party's central executive, and candidate for the Belize City Council. In 2010, at the National Convention of the United Democratic Party, he was elected overwhelmingly to the role of Party Chairman.

Faber is currently one of the youngest members of the Belizean House of Representatives. According to Belizean media, public confidence in Faber, the Ministry of Education and its restructuring has been positive. Consequently, Sir Colville Young, the Governor General of Belize, entrusted Faber with also running the Ministry of Youth. Faber has even served occasionally as acting prime minister, being responsible for running the affairs of state when the Prime Minister and Deputy Prime Minister are out of the country.

Despite recent political difficulties, Faber  will stand as a candidate for UDP party leader in a leadership convention set for 9 February 2020 to succeed the retiring Barrow. His opponent will be Minister of National Security, John Saldivar who is eyeing for the same position as him.

On the other hand, Former Deputy Prime Minister, Gaspar Vega has publicly indicated he would return to Politics. He will contest for UDP Deputy Leader to succeed Faber, along with Minister of Health, Pablo Marin who is eyeing for the same position as him.

Faber previously went against Saldivar in 2010 for Chairman of the UDP and 2016 for first Deputy Leader, winning both times.

In July 2020, Faber was appointed as Leader of the UDP after Prime Minister Dean Barrow stated his plans to retire. In the November General Elections, his party suffered one of the largest losses in its history, losing 14 seats from 19 down to only 5.

Personal life
Faber has a Fiance and has two sons and one daughter, Krischnxn (2005), Patrick Jr (2008) and Amani (2018). On 17 November 2017, Faber was a passenger in a Cessna 208B Grand Caravan aircraft of Tropic Air which struck a vehicle shortly after take-off from Placencia Airport for Punta Gorda Airport and subsequently ditched in the sea. All seven people on board survived.

References

1978 births
Living people
People from Belize City
United Democratic Party (Belize) politicians
Government ministers of Belize
Deputy Prime Ministers of Belize
Members of the Belize House of Representatives for Collet
University of North Florida alumni